Mathieu Cordier (born 8 March 1999), is an Australian professional footballer who plays as a left back. He is currently signed to Rockdale Ilinden FC which complete in the National Premier Leagues NSW.

Career

Western Sydney Wanderers
Cordier was part of the 2017-18 Y-League championship winning Western Sydney Wanderers Youth team. He played the full game as they beat Melbourne City Youth 3–1 in the 2018 Y-League Grand Final on 3 February 2018.

Cordier made his professional debut for Western Sydney Wanderers in the 2018 FFA Cup semi-final against Sydney FC on 6 October 2018, replacing Raúl Llorente in the 85th minute with the Wanderers going on to lose the game 3–0. He made his A-League debut on 18 January 2019, playing the full game as Western Sydney were downed 2-1 by Adelaide United at ANZ Stadium.

In October 2000, Cordier was on trial at English club Salford City F.C. However, he was unsuccessful to be signed by the club.

APIA Leichhardt

In February 2021, Cordier had signed to APIA Leichhardt.

Sydney Olympic FC

In September 2021, Cordier had signed at Sydney Olympic for 2022 National Premier Leagues NSW.

Rockdale Ilinden FC

In December 2022, Cordier had signed at Rockdale Ilinden for 2023 National Premier Leagues NSW.

Honours
Western Sydney Wanderers
Y-League: 2017–18

References

External links

1999 births
Living people
Australian people of French descent
Australian soccer players
National Premier Leagues players
Association football defenders
Western Sydney Wanderers FC players